Radio postaja Odžak or Radio Odžak is a Bosnian local public radio station, broadcasting from Odžak, Bosnia and Herzegovina.

In 1967, Radio Odžak was launched by the municipal council. 
In Yugoslavia and in SR Bosnia and Herzegovina, it was part of local/municipal Radio Sarajevo network affiliate.

This radio station broadcasts a variety of programs such as news, music, morning and talk shows. Program is mainly produced in Croatian from 7:00 am to 9:00 pm. Estimated number of potential listeners of Radio Odžak is around 57,163. Radiostation is also available in Bosanska Posavina area and in neighboring Croatia.

Frequencies
 Odžak

See also 
 List of radio stations in Bosnia and Herzegovina
 Radio Preporod
 Radiopostaja Orašje

References

External links 
 www.fmscan.org
 www.radioodzak.com
 Communications Regulatory Agency of Bosnia and Herzegovina

Odžak
Odžak
Radio stations established in 1967